The Migrant Rights Centre Ireland (MRCI) is a voluntary organisation advocating for migrant rights in Ireland.

History
Migrant Rights Centre Ireland (MRCI) are a voluntary organisation working with migrants in Ireland, advocating and advising on employment policy and legislation for immigrants.

Core activities
One of the core areas on which the MRCI focus is supporting migrants in low or minimum wage and less regulated work, who are at higher risk of poor and exploitative working conditions. They also support victims of trafficking for labour exploitation, and undocumented, unemployed or underemployed migrants. To facilitate this work, the MRCI provide access to rights and entitlements, provide information, conduct case work, and work with migrants in campaigning.

In response to the COVID-19 pandemic, MRCI advocated for those working in meat factories as a potential at-risk group with insufficient supports should they fall ill.

References

Human rights organisations based in Ireland
Organizations established in 2001
Non-profit organisations based in the Republic of Ireland